Amphissites is an extinct genus of ostracod (seed shrimp) belonging to the suborder Beyrichicopina (ornamented beyrichiocopids) and family Amphissitinae. Species belonging to the genus lived from the Devonian to the Permian in Europe, North America, Australia, and east Asia. The genus were likely deposit-feeders, and may have survived briefly into the Triassic.

Species 
 A. bushi Harlton 1933
 A. carinodus Cooper 1957
A. centronotus Ulrich and Bassler 1906
A. dattonensis Harlton 1927
A. gifuensis Tanaka and Yuan 2012
A. knighti Sohn 1954
A. marginiferus Roth 1929
A. miseri Harlton 1933
A. neocentronotus Becker and Wang 1992
A. nodosus Roth 1929
A. rugosus Girty 1910
A. sinensis Hou 1954
A. sosioensis Kozur 1991A. subcentronotus Hou 1954A. wapanuckensis'' Harlton 1929

References 

Paleozoic life
Ostracods
Prehistoric ostracod genera